Steven James Uhrinyak (November 23, 1914 – December 18, 1986) was an American football guard in the National Football League for the Washington Redskins.  He played college football at Franklin & Marshall College.

References

1914 births
1986 deaths
American football guards
Franklin & Marshall Diplomats football players
Washington Redskins players
Players of American football from Pennsylvania
People from Homestead, Pennsylvania